Stass Shpanin is a Soviet born, American contemporary visual artist.

Biography 

Stass Shpanin was born on May 16, 1990 in Baku – capital of Azerbaijan, one of the Soviet Republics.

As a teenager, Shpanin moved to Massachusetts in the United States, where he became interested in the history of the Imperial Russia that was forbidden and distorted in the USSR for nearly all of the 20th century. During his studies at the Hartford Art School, University of Hartford, Shpanin created a project titled Trialectics, where he combined different layers of history in united monumental compositions. After graduating in 2012, Shpanin travelled to Russia on a U.S. Fulbright fellowship, where he both continued his visual research of pictorial representations of the past and explored his personal relationship to the history of pre-revolution Russia. His current work is focused on fabricating American history using elements of the folklore Fraktur tradition practiced by European immigrants in the United States.

Shpanin has exhibited his work internationally, including the Smack Mellon Art Gallery, the Jasper Rand Art Museum, the Museum of Contemporary Russian Art, the ToBE Gallery, and the Gridchinhall Gallery, among others.

External links

Artists from Baku
Living people
Modern artists
20th-century American painters
American male painters
21st-century American painters
University of Hartford alumni
Artists from Massachusetts
1990 births
Azerbaijani emigrants to the United States
20th-century American male artists